Run Baby Run is a Ghanaian action film directed by Emmanuel Apea and starring John Apea. The film received 8 nominations and won 4 awards at the African Movie Academy Awards in 2008, including the awards for Best Picture, Best Director and Best Screenplay.

Plot 
Enoch Sarpong Jr., a Ghanaian student living in the UK, is visited by his little sister from Ghana, who had mistakenly picked up the wrong suitcase at the airport. The suitcase contains a huge amount of cocaine. Enoch decides to sell the drugs, however the real owners of the drugs soon meet up with him, chasing him all across the UK and Ghana.

Cast
John Apea - Enoch Sarpong Jr.
 Evelyn Addo - Nina
 Fred Johnson - Gator
 Collins Agyeman Sarpong - Cephas 
 Kofi Bucknor - Topp Dogg
 ''Kojo Dadson - Enoch Sarpong Snr

References

External links

2006 films
English-language Ghanaian films
2006 action films
Best Film Africa Movie Academy Award winners
2000s English-language films